The Women's Team Pursuit event at the 2010 South American Games was held on March 19.

Medalists

Results

Qualification

Finals

References
Qualification
Finals

Track cycling at the 2010 South American Games
Women's team pursuit (track cycling)